Limehouse was a railway station in Limehouse, London, on the London and Blackwall Railway (LBR).

It opened in July 1840 and was located at the junction of Bate Street and Three Colt Street, between Stepney station (which after several renamings is the current Limehouse station) and West India Docks station. It closed in May 1926, however the line continued to carry freight to the Isle of Dogs until the 1960s. The platforms at Limehouse were demolished soon after closure but the ground-level station buildings still survive to this day beneath the viaduct.

In the 1980s the viaduct it stood on was reused for the City branch of the Docklands Light Railway (DLR). The present-day Westferry DLR station stands 200 yards to the east of its site.

References

Limehouse at Subterranea Britannica

Disused railway stations in the London Borough of Tower Hamlets
Railway stations in Great Britain opened in 1840
Railway stations in Great Britain closed in 1926
Former London and Blackwall Railway stations
Railway station